Acharya Narendra Dev Nagar railway station is a small railway station in Faizabad district, Uttar Pradesh, India. Its code is ACND. It serves Faizabad city. The station consists of two platforms. The platforms are not well sheltered. It lacks many facilities including water and sanitation. This small station lies in the heart of the city near to chowk. It is another station to reach Faizabad.

References

Railway stations in Faizabad district
Lucknow NR railway division
Transport in Ayodhya